Daisies and Raindrops is an illustrated collection of short stories and poems for children by Amy Ella Blanchard.  It was first published in 1882 by E.P. Dutton.

This book contains excellent examples of children's illustrations from the "Golden Age" of illustration.

The illustrations from this book of Ida Waugh were used in a collection of sonnets for children, also entitled Daisies and Raindrops, by Scott Ennis.

Contents
 A Family of Daisies
 Raindrops
 Bert's Chinaman
 The Dog That Had No Home
 The Wheelbarrow
 Little Round Dot
 All of Us Kittens
 Alice
 The Flower That Smiled
 Violet and Pansy

References

1882 short story collections
Children's short story collections
E. P. Dutton books
Children's poetry books
American children's books
1880s children's books
Dogs in literature
Books about cats